Lower Harpton is a settlement and civil parish about 2.5 miles of Knighton, in the county of Herefordshire, England. In 2001, the parish had a population of 33. The parish touches Kington Rural, Knill and Old Radnor in Wales. Lower Harpton shares a parish council with Kington Rural.

Landmarks 
There is 1 listed building in Lower Harpton called Dunfield House which is Grade II listed.

History 
Lower Harpton was recorded in the Domesday Book as Hercope. Lower Harpton was formerly a township in the parish of Old Radnor, in 1866 Lower Harpton became a civil parish in its own right.

References 

Villages in Herefordshire
Civil parishes in Herefordshire